Ariel Bolívar Jurado Agrazal (born January 30, 1996) is a Panamanian professional baseball pitcher for the Kiwoom Heroes of the KBO League. He previously played in Major League Baseball (MLB) for the Texas Rangers and New York Mets.

Professional career

Texas Rangers
Jurado signed with the Texas Rangers as an international free agent in December 2012. He made his professional debut in 2013 with the Rookie-level DSL Rangers and spent the whole season there, going 6–0 with a 2.39 ERA in nine starts. In 2014 he played for the Rookie-level AZL Rangers , going 2–1 with a 1.63 ERA in  innings pitched. Jurado spent 2015 with the Hickory Crawdads of the Class A South Atlantic League, and was named the Nolan Ryan Minor League Pitcher of the Year by the Rangers after going 12–1 with a 2.45 earned run average (ERA) with 95 strikeouts and only 12 walks in 99 innings. In 2016, he pitched with both the High Desert Mavericks of the Class A-Advanced California League and the Frisco RoughRiders of the Double-A Texas League, combining to go 8–6 and 3.66 ERA in 123 innings. He returned to Frisco in 2017, where he posted a 9–11 record and a 4.59 ERA over 157 innings.

The Rangers added Jurado to their 40-man roster after the 2017 season. Jurado returned to Frisco to open the 2018 season and posted a 5–3 record with a 3.28 ERA and 58 strikeouts in  innings for them.

Jurado made his Major League debut on May 19, 2018, at Guaranteed Rate Field against the Chicago White Sox. He pitched  innings, giving up four earned runs on six hits, two walks, and two strikeouts, earning the loss as the White Sox defeated the Rangers 5–3. He finished his rookie season after going 5–5 with a 5.93 ERA in  innings for the Rangers. Left-handed batters had a higher batting average against him, .365 (in 20 or more innings), than against all other MLB pitchers.

In 2019, Jurado was optioned to the Nashville Sounds of the Triple-A Pacific Coast League to open the season, and went 3–0 with a 3.57 ERA over  innings for them. With Texas in 2019, Jurado went 7–11 with a 5.81 ERA in  innings.

Jurado was designated for assignment by the Rangers on July 31, 2020.

New York Mets
Jurado was traded to the New York Mets on August 5, 2020 in exchange for Stephen Villines and cash considerations. He was sent to the Mets alternate site in Brooklyn. On December 2, Jurado was nontendered by the Mets.

Minnesota Twins
Jurado underwent Tommy John surgery in January 2021 and missed the entire 2021 season. On March 20, 2022, Jurado signed a minor league contract with the Minnesota Twins organization. He elected free agency on November 10, 2022.

Kiwoom Heroes
On November 25, 2022, Jurado signed a 1 year contract with the Kiwoom Heroes of the KBO League for a total of $1 million, including an annual salary of $850,000 and an option of $150,000.

International career
Jurado was selected to represent Panama at the 2023 World Baseball Classic qualification.

References

External links

1996 births
Living people
People from Aguadulce District
Panamanian expatriate baseball players in the United States
Major League Baseball players from Panama
Major League Baseball pitchers
Texas Rangers players
New York Mets players
Dominican Summer League Rangers players
Gulf Coast Rangers players
Hickory Crawdads players
High Desert Mavericks players
Frisco RoughRiders players
Navegantes del Magallanes players
Panamanian expatriate baseball players in Venezuela
Nashville Sounds players
Estrellas Orientales players
Panamanian expatriate baseball players in the Dominican Republic
Fort Myers Mighty Mussels players
St. Paul Saints players